From kindergarten through high school, mathematics education in public schools in the United States has historically varied widely from state to state, and often even varies considerably within individual states. There has been considerable disagreement on the style and contents of mathematics teaching, including the question of whether or not there should be any national standards at all. Moreover, many students take alternatives to the traditional pathways, including accelerated tracks. As of 2023, twenty-seven states require students to pass three math courses before graduation from high school, but seventeen states and the District of Columbia require four.

With the adoption of the Common Core Standards most states and the District of Columbia, mathematics content across the country is moving into closer agreement for each grade level. The SAT, a standardized university entrance exam, has been reformed to better reflect the contents of the Common Core. However, Alabama, Arizona, Florida, Indiana, New Jersey, Oklahoma, South Carolina, and Tennessee have repealed the Common Core. Florida and New Jersey have introduced new standards while Oklahoma has restored its own. Minnesota has chosen to adopt Common Core standards for English language arts but not mathematics. Nebraska, Texas, and Virginia never signed on.

Curricular content
Each state sets its own curricular standards and details are usually set by each local school district. Although there are no federal standards, since 2015 most states have based their curricula on the Common Core State Standards in mathematics. The stated goal of the mathematics standards is to achieve greater focus and coherence in the curriculum. This is largely in response to the criticism that American mathematics curricula are "a mile wide and an inch deep." The National Council of Teachers of Mathematics published educational recommendations in mathematics education in 1991 and 2000 which have been highly influential, describing mathematical knowledge, skills and pedagogical emphases from kindergarten through high school. The 2006 NCTM Curriculum Focal Points have also been influential for its recommendations of the most important mathematical topics for each grade level through grade 8.

In the United States, mathematics curriculum in elementary and middle school is integrated, while in high school it traditionally has been separated by topic, like Algebra I, Geometry, Algebra II, each topic usually lasting for the whole school year. However, from 2013-14 onward, some school districts and states have switched to an integrated curriculum.

Primary school 

Primary schoolchildren learn counting, rudimentary arithmetic (both of integers and fractions), the number line, geometry, measurements, statistics and probability.

Secondary school 

Pre-algebra can be taken in middle school. Students learn about real numbers and some more arithmetic (prime numbers, prime factorization, and the fundamental theorem of arithmetic), the rudiments of algebra and geometry (areas of plane figures, the Pythagorean theorem, and the distance formula), and introductory trigonometry (definitions of the trigonometric functions).

Algebra I is the first course students take in algebra. Historically, this class was offered in high school but could be taken as early as the seventh grade but more traditionally in eighth or ninth grades, after the student has taken Pre-algebra. Students learn about real numbers and the order of operations (PEMDAS), functions, linear equations, graphs, polynomials, the factor theorem, radicals, and quadratic equations (factoring, completing the square, and the quadratic formula), and power functions.

Geometry, usually taken in ninth or tenth grade, introduces students to the notion of rigor in mathematics by way of some basic concepts in mainly Euclidean geometry. Students learn the rudiments of propositional logic, methods of proof (direct and by contradiction), parallel lines, triangles (congruence and similarity), circles (secants, chords, central angles, and inscribed angles), the Pythagorean theorem, elementary trigonometry (angles of elevation and depression, the law of sines), basic analytic geometry (equations of lines, point-slope and slope-intercept forms, perpendicular lines, and vectors), and geometric probability. Depending on the curriculum and instructor, students may receive orientation towards calculus, for instance with the introduction of the method of exhaustion and Cavalieri's principle.

Algebra II has Algebra I as a prerequisite and is traditionally a high-school-level course. Course contents include inequalities, quadratic equations, power functions, exponential functions, logarithms, systems of linear equations, matrices (including matrix multiplication,  matrix determinants, Cramer's rule, and the inverse of a matrix), the radian measure, graphs of trigonometric functions, trigonometric identities (Pythagorean identities, the sum-and-difference, double-angle, and half-angle formulas, the laws of sines and cosines), conic sections, among other topics.

The Common Core mathematical standards recognize both the sequential as well as the integrated approach to teaching high-school mathematics, which resulted in increased adoption of integrated math programs for high school. Accordingly, the organizations providing post-secondary education updated their enrollment requirements. For example, University of California requires three years of "college-preparatory mathematics that include the topics covered in elementary and advanced algebra and two- and three-dimensional geometry" to be admitted. After California Department of Education adopted Common Core, the University of California clarified that "approved integrated math courses may be used to fulfill part or all" of this admission requirement.

Pre-calculus follows from the above, and is usually taken by college-bound students. Pre-calculus combines algebra, analytic geometry, trigonometry, and analytic trigonometry. Topics in algebra include the binomial theorem, complex numbers, the Fundamental Theorem of Algebra, root extraction, polynomial long division, partial fraction decomposition, and matrix operations. In the chapters on analytic geometry, students are introduced to polar coordinates and deepen their knowledge of conic sections.  In the components of (analytic) trigonometry, students learn the graphs of trigonometric functions, trigonometric functions on the unit circle, the dot product, the projection of one vector onto another, and how to resolve vectors. If time and aptitude permit, students might learn Heron's formula, how to calculate the determinant of a  matrix via the rule of Sarrus, and the vector cross product. Students are introduced to the use of a graphing calculator to help them visualize the plots of equations and to supplement the traditional techniques for finding the roots of a polynomial, such as the rational root theorem and the Descartes rule of signs. Pre-calculus ends with an introduction to limits of a function. Some instructors might give lectures on mathematical induction and combinatorics in this course.

Depending on the school district, several courses may be compacted and combined within one school year, either studied sequentially or simultaneously. Without such acceleration, it may be not possible to take more advanced classes like calculus in high school. Students may also receive lessons on set theory at various grade levels throughout secondary school.

College algebra is offered at many community colleges as remedial courses. It should not be confused with abstract algebra and linear algebra, taken by students who major in mathematics and allied fields (such as computer science) in four-year colleges and universities.

Calculus is usually taken by high-school seniors or university freshmen, but can occasionally be taken as early as tenth grade. Unlike many other countries from France to Israel to Singapore, which require high school students aiming for a career in STEM or placed in the track for advanced mathematics to take calculus, the United States generally treats calculus as collegiate mathematics. A successfully completed college-level calculus course like one offered via Advanced Placement program (AP Calculus AB and AP Calculus BC) is a transfer-level course—that is, it can be accepted by a college as a credit towards graduation requirements. Prestigious colleges and universities are believed to require successful completion AP courses, including AP Calculus, for admissions.

In this class, students learn about limits and continuity (the intermediate and mean value theorems), differentiation (the product, quotient, and chain rules) and its applications (implicit differentiation, logarithmic differentiation, related rates, optimization, concavity, Newton's method, L'Hôpital's rules), integration and the Fundamental Theorem of Calculus, techniques of integration (u-substitution, by parts, trigonometric and hyperbolic substitution), further applications of integration (calculating accumulated change, various problems in the sciences and engineering, separable ordinary differential equations, arc length of a curve, areas between curves, volumes and surface areas of solids of revolutions), numerical integration (the midpoint rule, the trapezoid rule, Simpson's rule), infinite sequences and series and their convergence (the nth-term, comparison, ratio, root, integral,  p-series, and alternating series tests), Taylor's theorem (with the Lagrange remainder), Newton's binomial series, Euler's complex identity, polar representation of complex numbers, parametric equations, and curves in polar coordinates.

Depending on the course and instructor, special topics in introductory calculus might include the classical differential geometry of curves (arc-length parametrization, curvature, torsion, and the Frenet–Serret formulas), the epsilon-delta definition of the limit, first-order linear ordinary differential equations, Bernoulli differential equations. Some American high schools today also offer multivariable calculus (partial differentiation, the multivariable chain rule and Clairault's theorem; constrained optimization and Lagrange multipliers; multidimensional integration, Fubini's theorem, change of variables, and Jacobian determinants; gradients, directional derivatives, divergences, curls, the fundamental theorem of gradients, Green's theorem, Stokes' theorem, and Gauss' theorem).

Other optional mathematics courses may be offered, such as statistics (including AP Statistics) or business math. Students learn to use graphical and numerical techniques to analyze distributions of data (including univariate, bivariate, and categorical data), the various methods of data collection and the sorts of conclusions one can draw therefrom, probability, and statistical inference (point estimation, confidence intervals, and significance tests).

High school students of exceptional ability may be selected to join a competition, such as the USA Mathematical Olympiad.

Tertiary school 
All students in STEM, especially mathematics, physics, chemistry, computer science, and engineering must take single-variable calculus unless they have Advanced Placement credits (or equivalents, such as IB Math HL). Students majoring in mathematics, the physical sciences, and engineering then take multivariable calculus, linear algebra, complex variables, ordinary differential equations, and partial differential equations. In addition, mathematics students study abstract algebra, number theory, real analysis, advanced calculus, complex analysis, and advanced topics, such as integration and measure theory, Fourier analysis, functional analysis, differential geometry, and topology. They may further choose courses in applied mathematics, such as game theory or mathematical optimization. The calculus of variations and the history of mathematics may be taken as electives. Computer science majors must take courses on discrete mathematics (such as combinatorics and graph theory). Those who study biomedical and social sciences have to study statistics. Exact requirements and available courses will depend on the institution in question.

Exceptional undergraduates may participate in the annual William Lowell Putnam Mathematical Competition. At many colleges and universities, students may also compete in the Integration Bee.

Completion rates
Longitudinal analysis shows that the number of students completing high-school courses on calculus and statistics, including AP courses, have declined before 2019. Data taken from students' transcripts from the late 2000s to the mid-2010s reveals that majorities of students had completed Algebra I (96%), Geometry (76%), and Algebra II (62%). But not that many took Precalculus (34%), Trigonometry (16%), Calculus (19%), or Statistics (11%) and only an absolute minority took Integrated Mathematics (7%). Overall, female students were more likely to complete all mathematics courses, except Statistics and Calculus. Asian Americans were the most likely to take Precalculus (55%), Statistics (22%), and Calculus (47%) while African Americans were the least likely to complete Calculus (8%) but most likely to take Integrated Mathematics (10%) in high school. Students of lower socioeconomic status were less likely to pass Precalculus, Calculus, and Statistics.

Controversies
Mathematics education has been a topic of debate among academics, parents, as well as educators.

Progressive education 
During the first half of the twentieth century, there was a movement aimed at systematically reforming American public education along more "progressive" grounds. William Heard Kilpatrick, one of the most vocal proponents of progressive education, advocated for the de-emphasis of intellectual "luxuries" such as algebra, geometry, and trigonometry, calling them "harmful rather than helpful to the kind of thinking necessary for ordinary living." He recommended that more advanced topics in mathematics should only be taught to the select few. Indeed, prior to the Second World War, it was common for educationists to argue against the teaching of academic subjects and in favor of more utilitarian concerns of "home, shop, store, citizenship, and health," presuming that a majority of high school students could not embark on a path towards higher education but were instead, destined to become unskilled laborers or their wives.

By the 1940s, however, the deficiency in mathematical skills among military recruits became a public scandal. Admiral Chester Nimitz himself complained about the lack of skills that should have been taught in public schools among officers in training and volunteers. In order to address this issue, the military had to open courses to teach basic skills such as arithmetic for bookkeeping or gunnery.

Indeed, many parents opposed the progressive reforms, criticizing the lack of contents. By mid-century, technological marvels, such as radar, nuclear energy, and the jet engine, made progressive education untenable.

New Math 
Under the 'New Math' initiative, created after the successful launch of the Soviet satellite Sputnik in 1957, conceptual abstraction rather than calculation gained a central role in mathematics education. The educational status quo was severely criticized as a source of national humiliation and reforms were demanded, prompting Congress to introduce the National Defense Education Act of 1958. The U.S. federal government under President Dwight D. Eisenhower realized it needed thousands of scientists and engineers to match the might of its ideological rival the Soviet Union and started pouring enormous sums of money into research and development as well as education. Conceived in response to the lack of emphasis on content of the progressive education and the technological advances of World War II, New Math was part of an international movement influenced by the Nicholas Bourbaki school in France, attempting to bring the mathematics taught in schools closer to what research mathematicians actually use. Students received lessons in set theory, which is what mathematicians actually use to construct the set of real numbers, normally taught to advanced undergraduates in real analysis (see Dedekind cuts and Cauchy sequences). Arithmetic with bases other than ten was also taught (see binary arithmetic and modular arithmetic). Other topics included number theory, probability theory, and analytic geometry. 

However, this educational initiative soon faced strong opposition, not just from teachers, who struggled to understand the new material, let alone teach it, but also from parents, who had problems helping their children with homework. It was criticized by experts, too. In a 1965 essay, physicist Richard Feynman argued, "first there must be freedom of thought; second, we do not want to teach just words; and third, subjects should not be introduced without explaining the purpose or reason, or without giving any way in which the material could be really used to discover something interesting. I don't think it is worthwhile teaching such material." In his 1973 book, Why Johnny Can't Add: the Failure of the New Math, mathematician and historian of mathematics Morris Kline observed that it was "practically impossible" to learn new mathematical creations without first understanding the old ones, and that "abstraction is not the first stage, but the last stage, in a mathematical development." Kline criticized the authors of the 'New Math' textbooks, not for their mathematical faculty, but rather their narrow approach to mathematics, and their limited understanding of pedagogy and educational psychology. Mathematician George F. Simmons wrote in the algebra section of his book Precalculus Mathematics in a Nutshell (1981) that the New Math produced students who had "heard of the commutative law, but did not know the multiplication table."

By the early 1970s, this movement was defeated. Nevertheless, some of the ideas it promoted still lived on. One of the key contributions of the New Math initiative was the teaching of calculus in high school.

Standards-based reforms and the NCTM 

In 1989 the National Council for Teachers of Mathematics (NCTM) produced the Curriculum and Evaluation Standards for School Mathematics. Widespread adoption of the new standards notwithstanding, the pedagogical practice changed little in the United States during the 1990s. In fact, mathematics education became a hotly debated subject in the 1990s and early 2000s. This debate pitted mathematicians (like UC Berkeley mathematician Hung-Hsi Wu) and parents, many of whom with substantial knowledge of mathematics (such as the Institute of Advanced Study physicist Chiara R. Nappi), who opposed the NCTM's reforms against educational professionals, who wanted to emphasized what they called "conceptual understanding." In many cases, however, educational professionals did not understand mathematics as well as their critics. This became apparent with the publication of the book Knowing and Teaching Elementary Mathematics (1999) by Liping Ma. The author gave evidence that even though most Chinese teachers had only 11 or 12 years of formal education, they understood basic mathematics than did their U.S. counterparts, many of whom were working on their master's degrees.

In 1989, the more radical NCTM reforms were eliminated. Instead, greater emphasis was put on substantive mathematics. Moreover, as Hung-Hsi Wu explained, the apparent dichotomy between basic skills and understanding of mathematical concepts is a delusion. In some large school districts, this came to mean requiring some algebra of all students by ninth grade, compared to the tradition of tracking only the college-bound and the most advanced junior high school students to take algebra. A challenge with implementing the Curriculum and Evaluation Standards was that no curricular materials at the time were designed to meet the intent of the Standards. In the 1990s, the National Science Foundation funded the development of curricula such as the Core-Plus Mathematics Project. In the late 1990s and early 2000s, the so-called math wars erupted in communities that were opposed to some of the more radical changes to mathematics instruction. Some students complained that their new math courses placed them into remedial math in college. However, data provided by the University of Michigan registrar at this same time indicate that in collegiate mathematics courses at the University of Michigan, graduates of Core-Plus did as well as or better than graduates of a traditional mathematics curriculum, and students taking traditional courses were also placed in remedial mathematics courses. Mathematics instructor Jaime Escalante dismissed the NCTM standards as something written by a PE teacher.

In 2001 and 2009, NCTM released the Principles and Standards for School Mathematics (PSSM) and the Curriculum Focal Points which expanded on the work of the previous standards documents. Particularly, the PSSM reiterated the 1989 standards, but in a more balanced way, while the Focal Points suggested three areas of emphasis for each grade level. Refuting reports and editorials that it was repudiating the earlier standards, the NCTM claimed that the Focal Points were largely re-emphasizing the need for instruction that builds skills and deepens student mathematical understanding. These documents repeated the criticism that American mathematics curricula are a "mile wide and an inch deep" in comparison to the mathematics of most other nations, a finding from the Second and Third International Mathematics and Science Studies.

Integrated mathematics 

Many countries, such as Israel, teach mathematics according to what Americans call an integrated curriculum. Various aspects of calculus and prerequisites are taught throughout high school. In France and Germany, calculus was brought into the secondary-school curriculum thanks to the advocacy of famous mathematicians, such as Henri Poincaré and Felix Klein, respectively. According to mathematician David Bressoud, this approach makes it possible for other countries to require and to teach calculus in high school. However, as the Singaporean case demonstrates, early exposure to the concepts of calculus does not necessarily translates to actual understanding among high school students. Proponents of teaching the integrated curriculum believe that students would better understand the connections between the different branches of mathematics. On the other hand, critics—including parents and teachers—prefer the traditional American approach both because of their familiarity with it and because of their concern that certain key topics might be omitted, leaving the student ill-prepared for college. As mentioned above, only 7% of American high school students take Integrated mathematics. In fact, as the math wars of the 1990s raged on, the de-emphasis of calculus in the high school curriculum meant that the so-called "integrated" textbooks offered subpar and unsystematic developments of algebra, geometry, and trigonometry. But even before that, during the 1970s and 1980s, the number of students taking remedial courses in college had risen substantially.

Preparation for college 
Beginning in 2011, most states have adopted the Common Core Standards for mathematics, which were partially based on NCTM's previous work. Controversy still continues as critics point out that Common Core standards do not fully prepare students for college and as some parents continue to complain that they do not understand the mathematics their children are learning. Indeed, even though they may have expressed an interest in pursuing science, technology, engineering, and mathematics (STEM) in high school, many university students find themselves ill-equipped for rigorous STEM education in part because of their inadequate preparation in mathematics. Meanwhile, Chinese, Indian, and Singaporean students are exposed to high-level mathematics and science at a young age. About half of STEM students in the U.S. dropped out of their programs between 2003 and 2009. On top of that, many mathematics schoolteachers were not as well-versed in their subjects as they should be, and might well be uncomfortable with mathematics themselves. An emphasis on speed and rote memorization gives as many as one-third of students aged five and over mathematical anxiety.

By the mid-2010s, only a quarter of American high school seniors are able to do grade-level math, yet about half graduate from high school as A students, prompting concerns of grade inflation.

Another issue with mathematics education has been integration with science education.  This is difficult for public schools to do because science and math are taught independently.  The value of the integration is that science can provide authentic contexts for the math concepts being taught and further, if mathematics is taught in synchrony with science, then the students benefit from this correlation.

Enrichment programs 
Growing numbers of parents have opted to send their children to enrichment and accelerated learning after-school or summer programs in mathematics, leading to friction with school officials who are concerned that their primary beneficiaries are affluent white and Asian families, prompting parents to pick private institutions or math circles. Some public schools serving low-income neighborhoods even denied the existence of mathematically gifted students. In fact, while American educators tend to focus on poorly performing students rather than those at the top, unlike their Asian counterparts. Students identified by the Study of Mathematically Precocious Youth as top scorers on the mathematics (and later, verbal) sections of the SAT often became highly successful in their fields. By the mid-2010s, some public schools have begun offering enrichment programs to their students.

Standardized tests 
The Program for International Student Assessment (PISA) conducted the 2015 assessment test which is held every three years for 15-year-old students worldwide. In 2012, the United States earned average scores in science and reading. It performed better than other progressive nations in mathematics, ranking 36 out of 65 other countries. The PISA assessment examined the students’ understanding of mathematics as well as their approach to this subject and their responses. These indicated three approaches to learning. Some of the students depended mainly on memorization. Others were more reflective on newer concepts. Another group concentrated more on principles that they have not yet studied. The U.S. had a high proportion of memorizers compared to other developed countries. During the latest testing, the United States failed to make it to the top 10 in all categories including mathematics. More than 540,000 teens from 72 countries took the exam. Their average score in mathematics declined by 11 points.

According to a 2021 report by the National Science Foundation (NSF), American students' mathematical literacy ranks 25th out of 37 nations of the Organization for Economic Cooperation and Development (OECD).

During the 2000s  and 2010s, as more and more college-bound students take the SAT, scores have gone down. (See chart above.)

Results from the National Assessment of Educational Progress (NAEP) test show that scores in mathematics have been leveling off in the 2010s, but with a growing gap between the top and bottom students. The COVID-19 pandemic, which forced schools to shut down and lessons to be given online, further widened the divide, as the best students lost fewer points compared to the worst and therefore could catch up more quickly. While students' scores fell for all subjects, mathematics was the hardest hit, with a drop of eight points.

Advanced Placement Mathematics
There was considerable debate about whether or not calculus should be included when the Advanced Placement (AP) Mathematics course was first proposed in the early 1950s. AP Mathematics has eventually developed into AP Calculus thanks to physicists and engineers, who convinced mathematicians of the need to expose students in these subjects to calculus early on in their collegiate programs.

In the early 21st century, there has been a demand for the creation of AP Multivariable Calculus and indeed, a number of American high schools have begun to offer this class, giving colleges trouble in placing incoming students.

As of 2021, AP Precalculus was under development by the College Board, though there were concerns that universities and colleges would not grant credit for such a course, given that students had previously been expected to know this material prior to matriculation.

Conferences
Mathematics education research and practitioner conferences include: NCTM's Regional Conference and Exposition and Annual Meeting and Exposition; The Psychology of Mathematics Education's North American Chapter annual conference; and numerous smaller regional conferences.

See also

 Embodied design (mathematics education)
 Graduate science education in the United States
 Mathematics education in New York
 Stand and Deliver (1988 film)
 Math 55 at Harvard University

References

External links 
 Math courses with “Math Is Your Future”; an article about studying math with the use of Internet technologies
 Math is amazing and we have to start treating it that way, Eugenia Cheng for the PBS Newshour.

 
Curricula